Velampatty is a small village in Tamil Nadu. It is situated along the Palani-Tharapuram Highway, between Thoppampatty and Thasanaiken Patty. The nearest railway station is in Palani, about 16 kilometers away. Nearest airport is Coimbatore, 85 km away.

Villages in Dindigul district